Katrina Jackson (born 1991), known professionally as Kat Tat, is an American tattoo artist, television personality, and businesswoman. She is best known for starring in the VH1 television series Black Ink Crew: Chicago.

Biography
Kat Tat was born Katrina Jackson in 1991. She grew up in Chicago, Illinois. She studied mathematics at the University of Missouri. She left school to make tattooing a full-time job.

She starred in the VH1 television series Black Ink Crew: Chicago. In 2018, she opened Enigma Tattoo, a tattoo shop in Beverly Hills, California. She has tattooed Idris Elba, Trey Songz, Faith Evans, and Von Miller.

She is in a relationship with American football player Jamie Collins. They have two children.

Filmography

Television

References

External links
 

1991 births
American businesspeople
American tattoo artists
American television personalities
People from Chicago
Living people